On 10 November, 1943, men of the United States Marine Corps invaded the island of Betio, located at the southwest corner of Tarawa Atoll in the Gilbert Islands chain in the Central Pacific. This invasion, known as Operation Galvanic, was a phase of the Pacific Theatre of World War II. 

The landings on Betio were the Americans' third amphibious operation of the Pacific War, after Guadalcanal Island and Cape Torokina on Bougainville Island, but the first in which the Japanese vigorously resisted the landings on the beaches, pinning the Marines down with machine-gun and mortar fire. Worse, American planners at Pearl Harbor had grievously misjudged the timing of high tide at Betio, leaving the landing craft stranded on the shallow coral reefs where the Marines were slaughtered. 

The island was declared secure after three days. Given the small size of Betio (0.59 sq. mi.), planners had expected it to take one.

Command structure

Naval 

The roles of Commander in Chief, Pacific Ocean Areas (CINCPOA) and Commander in Chief, U.S. Pacific Fleet (CINCPAC), were both exercised by Admiral Chester W. Nimitz from his headquarters at Pearl Harbor, Hawaii.

Since the Gilberts and Marshalls lie in the Central Pacific, their capture was the responsibility of the U.S. Fifth Fleet, led by Vice Admiral Raymond A. Spruance from aboard his flagship, heavy cruiser Indianapolis.

The ships and troops of Operations Galvanic (landings on Tarawa Atoll) and Kourbash (landings on Makin Atoll) were under direct operational command of Rear Admiral Richmond Kelly Turner aboard old battleship Pennsylvania.

Ground troops 
 V Amphibious Corps
Major General Holland M. "Howlin' Mad" Smith
 Tarawa: 2nd Marine Division  (Major General Julian C. Smith)
 Makin: 27th Infantry Division (Army) (Major General Ralph C. Smith)

Both Admiral Turner and General Holland Smith sailed with the Northern Attack Force even though it was obvious that Tarawa would be the scene of the main ground action. If the Japanese mounted a counterattack, it was most likely to come from the Marshalls since the closest Japanese bases to the Gilberts were located there. Nimitz and Spruance wanted the two highest-ranking officers to sail with the forces that would be the first to encounter any such enemy response. Unbeknownst to the Americans, the Japanese had stripped almost all their naval and air assets from the Marshalls in an attempt to resist the Allied effort in the Central Solomons. Thus, no counterattack materialized.

American

Ground forces – Tarawa 

 2nd Marine Division 
Major General Julian C. Smith
 Asst. Div. Cmdr.: Brig. Gen. Leo D. Hermle
 Chief of Staff: Col. Merritt A. Edson
 Personnel officer (G-1): Lt. Col. C.P. van Ness
 Intelligence officer (G-2): Lt. Col. Thomas J. Colley
 Operations officer (G-3): Lt. Col. James P. Riseley
 Logistics officer (G-4): Lt. Col Jesse S. Cook

 Eastern landing area:
  8th Marine Regiment
 Colonel Elmer E. Hall
 Exec. Ofc.: Lt. Col. Paul D. Sherman
 First Wave (Red Beach 3): 2nd Battalion (Maj. Henry P. Crowe)
 Second Wave (Red Beach 3): 3rd Battalion (Maj. Robert H. Ruud)
 Third Wave (Red Beach 2): 1st Battalion (Maj. Lawrence C. Hays Jr.)

 Central landing area:
  2nd Marine Regiment
 Colonel David M. Shoup
 Exec. Ofc.: Lt. Col. Dixon Goen
 First Wave (Red Beach 1): 3rd Battalion (Maj. John F. Schoettel)
 First Wave (Red Beach 2): 2nd Battalion (Lt. Col. Herbert R. Amey, Jr. (KIA 20 Nov), then Lt. Col. Walter I. Jordan)
 Second Wave (Red Beach 2): 1st Battalion (Major Wood B. Kyle)

 Western landing area:
  6th Marine Regiment
 Colonel Maurice G. Holmes
 Exec. Ofc.: Lt. Col. Russell Lloyd
 Third Wave (Green Beach): 1st Battalion (Maj. William K. Jones)
 21–24 Nov (Outer Islands of Tarawa): 2nd Battalion (Lt. Col. Raymond L. Murray)
 Fourth Wave (Green Beach): 3rd Battalion (Lt. Col. Kenneth F. McLeod)

  10th Marine Regiment (Artillery)
 Colonel Thomas E. Bourke
 Exec. Ofc.: Lt. Col. Ralph E. Forsyth
 1st Battalion (Lt. Col. Presley M. Rixey)
 2nd Battalion (Lt. Col. George R. E. Shell)
 3rd Battalion (Lt. Col. Manly L. Curry)
 4th Battalion (Lt. Col. Kenneth A. Jorgensen)
 5th Battalion (Maj. Howard V. Hiett)

  18th Marine Regiment (Engineer)
 Colonel Cyril W. Martyr
 Exec. Ofc.: Lt. Col. Ewart S. Laue
 1st Battalion (Engineers) (Maj. George L.H. Cooper)
 2nd Battalion (Pioneers) (Lt. Col. Chester J. Salazar)
 3rd Battalion (Seabees) (Cmdr. Lawrence E. Tull, USN)

 Other units
 2nd Defense Battalion
 2nd Amphibian Tractor Battalion (Maj. Henry C. Drewes (KIA 20 Nov))
 2nd Tank Battalion (Lt. Col. Alexander B. Swenceski)

Ground forces – Makin 
  27th Infantry Division (Army)
 Major General Ralph C. Smith
 165th Regimental Combat Team 
 3rd Battalion / 105th Infantry Regiment ("Appleknockers")

Japanese 

Gilbert Islands defense forces
Rear Admiral Keiji Shibazaki (KIA 20 Nov)
Approx. 5,000 total men under arms
 3rd Special Base Force
 7th Sasebo SNLF
 111th Construction Unit
 4th Fleet Construction Dept. (detachment)

See also 
Orders of battle involving United States Marine forces in the Pacific Theatre of World War II:
 Battle of Guadalcanal order of battle
 Battle of Saipan order of battle
 Guam (1944) order of battle
 Battle of Leyte opposing forces
 Battle of Peleliu opposing forces
 Battle of Iwo Jima order of battle
 Okinawa ground order of battle
Naval Base Tarawa

Sources

Notes 

Battle of Tarawa
World War II orders of battle
World War II operations and battles of the Pacific theatre
United States Marine Corps in World War II
Battles and operations of World War II involving Japan